David Lakin Harrison (1 October 1926 – 19 March 2015) was an English zoologist who established, with his family, the Harrison Zoological Museum, later known as the Harrison Institute.

References

People from Sevenoaks
English zoologists
1926 births
2015 deaths